Montmartre is a large hill in Paris, France.

Montmartre may also refer to:

Montmartre (duo), an electronic music duo from Paris, France
Rural Municipality of Montmartre No. 126, a rural municipality
Montmartre, Saskatchewan, a village in Saskatchewan, Canada
Montmartre (Van Gogh series)
Café Montmartre, a defunct restaurant in Hollywood, California
Jazzhus Montmartre, a jazz club in Copenhagen, Denmark
 Montmartre, the United States title for the 1923 German drama film Die Flamme
 Montmartre (1925 film), a 1925 French silent film
 Montmartre (1931 film), a 1931 French drama film
 Montmartre (1941 film), a 1941 French romantic comedy film
 Montmartre (horse)
 "Montmartre", a song by Irving Berlin

See also
 Live at Montmartre (disambiguation)